Brian Head Ski Resort is a ski destination for Southern Utah and the southern California, Arizona, and Las Vegas areas. It is located 3.5 hours north of Las Vegas and four hours south of Salt Lake City. The resort is Utah's southernmost. Brian Head Resort was established in 1964, and once operated as a one chairlift resort. Currently, the resort has 8 chairlifts, 71 runs, and over 650 skiable acres. It also features a bridge between its two skiable mountains.

Statistics
 Base elevation: 9,600 ft (2926 m)
 Summit elevation: 11,307 ft (3446 m)
 Vertical rise: 1,707 ft (520 m)
 Total mountain peaks: 2
 Total skiable area: 660 acres (2.2 km²)
 Lifts: (8 total)
2 High Speed Quad chairs, 5 Triple chairs, 1 double chair, and 2 surface lifts.
 Terrain:
 Beginner: 35%
 Intermediate: 35%
 Advanced 20%
 Expert: 10%
 Winter season: mid-November through mid-April.

Lifts and Additional Information
There are 8 chairs at the resort. Chair 6 is the only double. Chairs 1, 3, 5, 7-8 are all triples. Chairs 2 and 4 are high speed quads. Lift names are as follows: 
1: Wildflower 
2: Giant Steps Express
3: Blackfoot
4: Navajo Express
5: Roulette
6: Pioneer
7: The Dunes
8: Alpen Glow

The lifts 1, 4, and 6 are located on the Navajo Peak mountain and lifts 2, 3, 5, 7, and 8 are on the Brian Head Peak mountain.  The ski bridge that connects the resorts goes over Utah Highway UT-143 with lift number 1 located just to the east of the bridge.  The lift starts near the base of the Brian Head Peak side and goes to the top of the Navajo Peak side.

Navajo Peak
The Navajo Peak side provides more beginner and intermediate terrain.  The number 6 lift provides the easiest terrain on the mountain and is perfect for beginners. There are also two surface lifts just below lift number 6 designed specifically for beginners.  This mountain  has one advanced (black diamond) run.

Brian Head Peak
The Brian Head Peak side provides a good balance of intermediate terrain and advanced terrain with some beginner runs near the base.  There are advanced runs throughout this side with most advanced near the number 5, 7, and 8 lifts.  Number 2 lift is one of two high speed quad lifts at the resort and takes you to the chair lift summit of 10,900 feet.

References

External links
 Brian Head Resort
 Winter Trail Map
 Brian Head Resort Facebook Page
 Brian Head Resort Twitter Page
Copper Chase Condominiums Page

Ski areas and resorts in Utah
Buildings and structures in Iron County, Utah
1965 establishments in Utah
Tourist attractions in Iron County, Utah